Beginning in the 16th century Spain established missions throughout New Spain (consisting of Mexico and portions of what today are the Southwestern United States) in order to facilitate colonization of these lands.

History

Early Franciscan missions
The indigenous peoples of Arizona remained unknown to European explorers until 1540 when Spanish explorer Pedro de Tovar (who was part of the Coronado expedition) encountered the Hopi while searching for the legendary Seven Cities of Gold. Contact with Europeans remained infrequent until three missions were established in 1629 in what is now northeastern Arizona.

In 1680, the Pueblo Revolt resulted in the destruction of all three missions, greatly limiting Spanish influence in the region. Subsequent attempts to reestablish the missions in Hopi villages were met with repeated failures. The former mission is still visible today as a ruin.

Jesuit missions
In the spring of 1687, the Jesuit missionary Eusebio Francisco Kino lived and worked with the Native Americans in the area called the Pimería Alta, or "Upper Pima Country," which presently includes the Mexican state of Sonora and the southern portion of Arizona. During Father Eusebio Kino's stay in the Pimería Alta, he founded over twenty missions in eight mission districts. In Arizona, unlike Mexico, missionization proceeded slowly.

Father Kino founded missions San Xavier and San Gabriel at the Piman communities of Bac and Guevavi along the Santa Cruz River.

Late Franciscan missions
Following the expulsion of the Jesuits in 1767, the Franciscans from the college of Santa Cruz in Querétaro took over responsibility in the Pimería Alta missions. Meanwhile, other Franciscans from the college of San Fernando in Mexico City under the leadership of Junípero Serra, were assigned to replace the Jesuits in the Baja California missions of the lower Las Californias Province.

Under the administration of Franciscan friar and explorer Francisco Garcés, three additional missions were established with the goal of establishing a permanent connection between the missions of Las Californias and Pimería Alta. However, following a Quechan raid in 1781 that destroyed two mission near present-day Yuma, the two regions remained isolated. This greatly limited the expansion of Spanish influence throughout the lower Colorado River.

Following the Mexican War of Independence and the expulsion of all Spanish-born priests from the region in 1828, the remaining missions were gradually abandoned. Mission San Xavier del Bac was the last mission to be abandoned, with the last priest leaving for Spain in 1837.

Missions

See also
On Spanish Missions in neighboring regions:
 Spanish missions in California
 Spanish missions in New Mexico
 Spanish missions in the Sonoran Desert (including Sonora and southern Arizona)

On general missionary history:
 Catholic Church and the Age of Discovery
 List of the oldest churches in Mexico

On colonial Spanish American history:
 Spanish colonization of the Americas
 California mission clash of cultures

References

External links
 National Park Service, Kino Missions
 Arizona Education, Kino Missions

 
New Spain
Colonial Mexico
Colonial United States (Spanish)
Jesuit history in North America
History of Catholicism in the United States
Spanish colonization of the Americas